Cobra: John Zorn's Game Pieces Volume 2 is an album by John Zorn that includes his game piece, Cobra. The piece was recorded in previous versions by the labels HatHut (Cobra in 1985), Knitting Factory (Live at the Knitting Factory in 1992), and Avant (Tokyo Operations '94 in 1994) but this was the first time by Zorn's label Tzadik.

Reception
The Allmusic review by Steve Loewy awarded the album four stars, stating, "Cobra is a fun-filled, mystical, blindfolded ride down a dark alley that circles back every few yards... Almost like a Talmudic tapestry, the intricate complexities are in full flower here, with constantly changing snippets, twisted sounds, swirls of ornate and not-so-ornate clusters, and shimmering beauty."

Track listing 
All compositions by John Zorn
 "Pendet" – 4:49
 "Tabana" – 10:47
 "Uluwati" – 7:27
 "Tamangiri" – 7:50
 "Paras" – 6:07
 "Sangeh" – 11:26
 "Penganggahan" – 10:44
 "Raksasa" – 4:44
 "Goa Gajah" – 6:50

Personnel 
 John Zorn – prompter
 Josh Roseman – trombone
 Marcus Rojas – tuba
 Jennifer Choi – violin
 Mark Feldman – violin
 Erik Friedlander – cello
 Sylvie Courvoisier – piano
 Jamie Saft – keyboards
 Derek Bailey – guitar
 Trevor Dunn – bass
 Mark Dresser – bass
 Susie Ibarra – drums
 Cyro Baptista – percussion
 Annie Gosfield – sampler
 Ikue Mori – laptop computer

References 

2002 albums
Tzadik Records albums
Cobra (Zorn) albums
Albums produced by John Zorn